Serbian League West is a section of the Serbian League, Serbia's third football league. Teams from the western part of Serbia are in this section of the league. The other sections are Serbian League East, Serbian League Vojvodina, and Serbian League Belgrade.

Teams
 GFK Jasenica 1911
 FK Jedinstvo Ub
 FK Jedinstvo Putevi
 FK Mačva Šabac
 FK Polet Ljubić
 FK Partizan Bumbarevo Brdo
 FK Pobeda Beloševac
 FK Radnički Stobex
 FK Rudar Kostolac
 FK Sloboda Čačak
 FK Sloga Bajina Bašta
 FK Sloga Petrovac
 FK Sloga Požega
 FK Šumadija Aranđelovac
 FK Vujić Voda
 FK Železničar Lajkovac

External links
 Football Association of Region West Serbia - Official Site
 

Serbian League West seasons
3
Serb